Biola is a Ukrainian producer of juices and soft drinks. Biola is part of the bigger Ukrainian business group Privat Group.

Biola also is a long-time sponsor of FC Dnipro, general sponsor of the Tennis Federation of Ukraine, BC Dnipro and was a title sponsor of the 2008-09 Ukrainian Premier League.

History 
The company appeared with establishing of the Erlan Factory in Dnipro in 1997. In 2005 the company expanded and built another factory in Kyiv, Orlan Factory. In 200 the firm launched an additional line for the production of soft drinks at the Orlan plant. In 2014 the company experienced its rebranding having changed the logo and the slogan.

Biola is a partner of the World Ladies Cup fitness tournament..

Gallery

References

External links
 Official webpage
About Biola company (in Russian)

Companies based in Kyiv
Companies based in Dnipro
Ukrainian brands
Ukrainian cuisine
Ukrainian drinks
Privat Group